Alphonse Baume (24 December 1933 – 25 July 2014) was a Swiss cross-country skier. He competed at the 1960 Winter Olympics and the 1964 Winter Olympics.

References

1933 births
2014 deaths
Swiss male cross-country skiers
Olympic cross-country skiers of Switzerland
Cross-country skiers at the 1960 Winter Olympics
Cross-country skiers at the 1964 Winter Olympics
Sportspeople from Bern